Bachan (also Romanized as Bāchān; also known as Bachoon and Bāchūn) is a village in Nujin Rural District, in the Central District of Farashband County, Fars Province, Iran. At the 2006 census, its population was 284, in 60 families.

References 

Populated places in Farashband County